Craterosiphon is a genus of flowering plants belonging to the family Thymelaeaceae.

Its native range is Tropical Africa.

Species:

Craterosiphon beniensis 
Craterosiphon devredii 
Craterosiphon louisii 
Craterosiphon micranthus 
Craterosiphon montanus 
Craterosiphon pseudoscandens 
Craterosiphon quarrei 
Craterosiphon scandens 
Craterosiphon schmitzii 
Craterosiphon soyauxii

References

Thymelaeaceae
Malvales genera